Girolamo da Ponte also known as Gerolamo Bassano (3 June 1566 – 8 Nov 1621) was an Italian painter of the Renaissance period.

Born at Bassano del Grappa 3 June 1566, he was the youngest son of painter Jacopo da Bassano. He also copied his father's pictures, and like his brother Giambattista, must take his share in the prolific number of canvases attributed to Jacopo Bassano. He painted an Apparition of the Virgin to St. Barbara in Bassano. He also collaborated with his brother Leandro Bassano, including portraits of Sagredo.

He died in Venice on 8 Nov 1621.

References

1560 births
1622 deaths
People from the Province of Vicenza
16th-century Italian painters
Italian male painters
17th-century Italian painters
Painters from Venice
Italian Mannerist painters